Srinu Pandranki (Telugu: శ్రీను పాండ్రంకి) (born 5 October 1987) is an Indian author, short film maker and screenwriter. He is noted for directing the short film Peekaboo and for his debut novel .

Short films

Made thirty short films. Directional debut with the award-winning short film Flat No. 101. Next short film Art of Living is a 5-minute film depicting the life of an individual with and without a smile. This was followed by the short films Break the Silence and Pink Slip. The latter brought him recognition and nominations in various film festivals across the country. His short film Hour Glass is a silent film portraying a girl waiting for her parents to come home on her birthday. It is structured as a visual palindrome, the first of its kind. His short films are mostly known for their screenplays and unusual structure.

His two music videos were telecast on MAA music, a leading music channel in the Indian state of Andhra Pradesh.

His next short film Peek-a-boo is selected as an official entry in the Cannes Short Film Corner on 26 March 2014. It features Chaitanya Krishna in the lead role.

In 2017, he made a short film The Decision with noted Telugu film actress Lakshmi Manchu for which all top technicians including Anup Rubens Jayanan Vincent and Marthand K. Venkatesh have worked. It has been officially selected to 9th Jaipur International Film Festival 2017 and 5th Delhi Shorts International Film festival 2016.

His short film Estella (2017) featuring Ravi Varma has been screened in Cannes Film Festival 2017.

His next short film was Unusual, an experimental English film shot entirely in Germany.

He went onto make 2 Telugu music videos later on, one in India and another in Nepal.

Novels

His debut novel , a crime thriller based in California in the United States, was released on 12 April 2014. It was launched by Ram Gopal Varma, a popular Indian director.

His Telugu novel "Nijanga Nenena", coming of age drama based in Hyderabad was released on 5 October 2021. Popular director V. N. Aditya was the chief guest and prominent directors and writers of Telugu film industry graced the event.

Filmography

Bibliography

See also
 List of Indian writers

References

Writers from Andhra Pradesh
1987 births
Living people
People from Vizianagaram
Indian filmmakers